Menneville is the name of two communes in France:
 Menneville, Aisne
 Menneville, Pas-de-Calais